The Eighth Street Bridge in Sioux Falls, South Dakota brings S. Eighth St. over the Big Sioux River.  It is a triple-arch concrete deck arch bridge that was built in 1912 by N.M. Stark and Company.  It has also been known as South Dakota Dept. of Transportation Bridge No. 50-203-206.  It was listed on the National Register of Historic Places in 1993.

Its NRHP nomination notes that it has a four-lane roadway and rests on piers that "are protected by pointed cutwaters with conical caps." The roadway is "flanked by sidewalks and concrete railings with neoclassically detailed balustrades. The railings mark the position of
each pier with an elegant, fluted cast-iron light stand ornamented with consoles at the base."

Restoration work on the bridge was done in 1977.

References

Road bridges on the National Register of Historic Places in South Dakota
Bridges completed in 1912
1912 establishments in South Dakota
National Register of Historic Places in Sioux Falls, South Dakota
Arch bridges in the United States
[[Category:Concrete bridges in the United Statesdeez